Francis Joseph Reitz (1841–1930) was an American banker, civic leader, and philanthropist in Evansville, Indiana.

Career 
For more than 50 years, he was a leading figure in the Evansville's business life, retiring in 1924 as president of National City Bank (known most recently as Integra Bank). Reitz was a director of the bank for more than 40 years and was its president for 31 years. After he retired, he devoted his time to disposing through philanthropy of the vast wealth he had accumulated.

In business circles, he was widely respected for his principled sense of business and high sense of public responsibility in the conduct of business. His obituary cited that Reitz was a gentleman of the "old school" and preferred to avoid public attention.

He attributed his longevity to seldom worrying and keeping regular habits. Reitz claimed to have always slept nine hours each night and, after business hours, forgot business and refused to discuss it at his home.

Legacy 

Reitz gave millions of dollars to various charities, churches, and educational organizations. According to his obituary, he regarded wealth, power. and brains as stewardships, and he felt they should be used for the benefit of all mankind.

His gifts included ample contributions for helping start Reitz Memorial High School, a Catholic institution, and the West Side's public school also bearing his name, FJ Reitz High School. At the dedication of the Catholic school — founded in 1922 on the city's east side — Bishop Joseph Chartrand of Indianapolis arrived as the emissary of the pope to bestow on Reitz the title of Commander of the Order of Pius IX. Reitz was the first individual in Indiana and the third individual in the United States to receive the high honor.

Reitz also gave heavily to Evansville's Little Sisters of the Poor on behalf of his father, John Augustus Reitz, and was a strong supporter of St. Vincent Orphanage in Vincennes. He didn't confine his generosity to his own church, however. He also contributed substantially to the building fund of Evansville College (now the University of Evansville), a Methodist institution. Reitz was a proponent of education for young men and indicated he regretted not having had the opportunity to obtain more formal education himself.

Reitz's home (built by his father), at the corner of First and Chestnut Streets in Evansville, is now the Reitz Home Museum, the state's only Victorian house museum.

References 

People from Evansville, Indiana
American bankers
American people of German descent
1841 births
1930 deaths